Rauvolfia media grows as a shrub or small tree up to  tall. Its fragrant flowers feature white to dull yellow corolla lobes. Its habitat is dry forest and savanna from sea level to  altitude. Extracts of the plant, mixed with food, have been used to poison pest animals. Rauvolfia media is native to Madagascar and the Comoros.

References

media
Plants described in 1947
Plants used in traditional African medicine
Flora of Madagascar
Flora of the Comoros